This is a list of Turkish television related events from 2004.

Events
15 May - The 49th Eurovision Song Contest is held at the Abdi İpekçi Arena. Ukraine wins the contest with the song "Wild Dances", performed by Ruslana.
19 June - Emrah Keskin wins the first season of Türkstar.
 July - Barış Akarsu wins the first season of Academi Türkiye.

Debuts

Television shows

Ending this year

Births

Deaths

See also
2004 in Turkey

References